This is a list of mayors in the Zambian capital, Lusaka.

List

Mayors, 1954–1982
Source:

Governors, 1982–1991
(decentralisation – one-party participatory era)

Mayors – Multi-party era, 1991–present

References

Lists of mayors
Lists of Zambian politicians
Mayors